Dongho Bridge is a bridge over the Han River in Seoul, South Korea.  It carries road traffic and Seoul Subway Line 3, and Oksu Station is located at the northern end of this bridge.

The Dongho bridge connects to Apgujeong neighborhood of Gangnam District to the border of Yongsan and Seongsu District. 

Bridges in Seoul
Bridges completed in 1985
Bridges over the Han River (Korea)
Rapid transit bridges
Road-rail bridges
Seoul Subway Line 3